Mark Wright is a New Zealand actor. He is best known for starring in Shortland Street and the Power Rangers franchise.

Biography
He was raised in St Heliers and educated at Sacred Heart College, Auckland, Selwyn College, Auckland, and Toi Whakaari. He graduated from Toi Whakaari with a Diploma in Acting in 1985. He was a stage actor in Wellington, and his first television appearance was as Mick Ryan in Peppermint Twist.

He was the 1994 TV Guide Television Award for Best Performer in an Entertainment Programme and the 1996 TV Guide Best Actor Award.

In 1996, a complaint was made to the New Zealand Advertising Standards Complaints Board about a Redskins advertisement aired on New Zealand television. The advertisement featured Wright dressed in American Indian clothing and assuming an accent. A mock drumbeat featured on the soundtrack. Despite protest from Nestlé New Zealand that the advertisement was inoffensive, the Board upheld the complaint.

Personal life
In 2017, Wright announced that he would sell his collection of film memorabilia.

Wright is also a professional speaker.

Filmography

Television roles
1994
That Comedy Show
1995
Sportsnight
Comedy Central
1998
Newsflash - Leonard Foxx
2003
Power Rangers Ninja Storm - Businessman
2019
Power Rangers Beast Morphers - General Burke
Undated
Peppermint Twist, Mick Ryan.
Shark in the Park
Shortland Street - Nurse Gary Fraser
The Billy T James Show - Nigel Fitchurch
1990: The Issues - Various Characters
Issues - Various Characters
More Issues - Various Characters
City Life - Derek Gillespie
The Amazing Extraordinary Friends - Ben's Father

Voice-over roles
Meet the Feebles - Sid the Elephant, The Masked Masochist, Louie the Dog, The Fish, Poodle, Bartender, Crab, Chorus-girls (voices)
The Great Kiwi Video Show - Voices
Power Rangers Ninja Storm - Amphibidor, Bopp-A-Roo, Mr. Ratwell (voices)
Power Rangers Dino Thunder - Rojobot, White Terrorsaurus/White Terrorsaurus II (voices)
Power Rangers S.P.D. - Rhinix, T-Top, Katana (voices)
Power Rangers Mystic Force - Warmax (voice)
Power Rangers Operation Overdrive - Magmador (voice)
Power Rangers Jungle Fury - Scorch (voice)
Power Rangers Samurai - Rofer, Epoxar (voices)
Power Rangers Megaforce - Argus, Rotox, Rotox DX (voices)
Power Rangers Dino Super Charge - Hookbeard, Doomwing (voices)
Power Rangers Super Ninja Steel - Deceptron (voice)
Power Rangers Beast Morphers - Clawtron (voice)
Power Rangers Dino Fury - Trawler (voice)

Movie roles
Alex - Female Commentator
Kevin Rampenbacker and the Electric Kettle - Kevin
I'm So Lonesome I Could Cry - Bill
Her Majesty - Freezing Works Foreman

Theatre
Undated
The Rocky Horror Show
A Way of Life

References

External links

New Zealand male voice actors
Living people
Year of birth missing (living people)
New Zealand male television actors
New Zealand male film actors
New Zealand male soap opera actors
People educated at Selwyn College, Auckland
People educated at Sacred Heart College, Auckland
Toi Whakaari alumni